Turpin may refer to:

People

Given name
Tilpin, a name later corrupted as Turpin, Roman Catholic bishop in 8th-century France
Turpin of Brechin, 12th-century bishop of Brechin, Scotland
Turpin Bannister (1904–1982), American architectural historian and academic

Surname
Barbara Turpin, American atmospheric scientist
Ben Turpin (1869–1940), American comedian
Charles Murray Turpin (1878–1946), member of the U.S. House of Representatives from Pennsylvania
Clément Turpin (born 1982), French football referee
David and Louise Turpin, an American couple arrested in 2018 for child abuse 
David H. Turpin (born 1956), Canadian academic
Dick Turpin (died 1739), English highwayman 
Dick Turpin (boxer) (1920–1990), English boxer
Dominique Turpin (born 1957); French/Swiss academic
Edmund Hart Turpin (1835–1907), British organist, composer and choir leader
Eugène Turpin (1848–1927), French chemist
François Henri Turpin (1709–1799), French writer
Franck Turpin (born 1977), French footballer
George Turpin (born 1952), English boxer and 1972 Olympic bronze medalist
J. Clifford Turpin (1886–1966), early American aviator
James Turpin (organist) (1840–1896), British organist, composer and teacher
James H. Turpin (1846–1893), U.S. Army first sergeant and Medal of Honor recipient
James Wesley Turpin (born 1928), founder of Project Concern International, advocate for wrongful life tort law
Joe Turpin, Canadian soccer player
John Henry Turpin (1876–1962), one of the first African-American chief petty officers in the U.S. Navy
KaVontae Turpin (born 1996), American football player
Kenneth Turpin (1915–2005), English historian, Vice-Chancellor of the University of Oxford
Louis Washington Turpin (1849–1903), United States congressman from Alabama
Ludovic Turpin (born 1975), French professional road racing cyclist
Melvin Turpin (1960–2010), American basketball player
Miles Turpin, National Football League player
Najai Turpin (1981–2005), American boxer
Pierre Jean François Turpin (1775–1840), French botanist
Randy Turpin (1928–1966), English boxer
Tom Turpin (1871–1922), American ragtime composer
Waters Edward Turpin (1910–1968), American novelist, professor

Fictional characters
 Turpin, in the novel The Three Hostages by Scottish author John Buchan
Betty Turpin (later Williams), fictional character in the British soap opera Coronation Street
Cyril Turpin, fictional character in the British soap opera Coronation Street
Dan Turpin, DC Comics police inspector
Jane Turpin, character in children's literature created by Evadne Price
 Judge Turpin, chief antagonist in Sweeney Todd (musical)
 Ruby Turpin, protagonist in "Revelation" by Flannery O'Connor

Places
Turpin, Oklahoma, an unincorporated community 
Turpin, Virginia, an unincorporated community
Turpin site, an archaeological site in Ohio
Turpin's Cave, a location in Epping Forest, Essex, attributed as a hiding place of the highwayman Dick Turpin

Other uses
HMS Turpin (P354), a Royal Navy submarine
Turtles (video game), a 1981 arcade game by Konami also known as Turpin
Turpin High School (Hamilton County, Ohio)
Turpin case, a case of abuse against minors by their parents that took place in 2018

See also
 Historia Caroli Magni, sometimes called the Turpin Chronicle, a 12th-century forgery

French-language surnames